Archery at the 1964 Summer Paralympics consisted of twelve events, eight for men and four for women.

Medal table

Participating nations

Medal summary

Men's events

Women's events

References 

 

1964 Summer Paralympics events
1964
Paralympics